Ma Yugang (born March 1968) is a Chinese nuclear physicist and an academician of the Chinese Academy of Sciences (CAS). He is currently a professor at Fudan University.

Biography
Ma was born in Luting Township of Yuyao, Zhejiang in March 1968, while his ancestral home is in Ninghai County. He attended the Yuyao No. 8 High School. In 1989 he graduated from Zhejiang University, where he majored in physics. In 1994 he received his Doctor of Science degree from Shanghai Institute of Nuclear Research. 

Ma's elder brother  is also a physicist and a professor at Nanjing University who elected an academician of the Chinese Academy of Sciences in 2021.  

In 1994, he joined the Institute of Nuclear Research, Chinese Academy of Sciences (CAS) as a researcher. In 2015, he became a Fellow of the American Physical Society (APS). In 2017, was elected an academician of the Chinese Academy of Sciences (CAS).

Award
 2015 Achievement in Asia Award (Robert T. Poe Prize)

References

1968 births
People from Yuyao
Living people
Zhejiang University alumni
Fellows of the American Physical Society
Members of the Chinese Academy of Sciences
Scientists from Ningbo
Physicists from Zhejiang